†Partula approximata was a species of air-breathing tropical land snail, a terrestrial pulmonate gastropod mollusk in the family Partulidae. This species was endemic to French Polynesia. It is now extinct.

References

 Mollusc Specialist Group 1996.  Partula approximata.   2006 IUCN Red List of Threatened Species.   Downloaded on 7 August 2007.

A
Extinct gastropods
Extinct animals of Oceania
Fauna of French Polynesia
Molluscs of Oceania
Molluscs of the Pacific Ocean
Taxonomy articles created by Polbot